Liechtensteiners are Germanic people native to Liechtenstein linked strictly with Swiss Germans and Swabians. There were approximately 34,000 Germanic Liechtensteiners worldwide at the turn of the 21st century.

Notes

References

Sources

 
Germanic ethnic groups